Rahimullah Haqqani (died 11 August 2022) was an Afghan cleric. He was a supporter of the Taliban and a critic of the Islamic State – Khorasan Province (IS-K). He believed that women could be educated as he felt there was nothing present in Islamic law that forbade it. 

He had previously survived two assassination attempts, including a 2020 bombing in Peshwar, Pakistan, which killed seven people.

Death 
On 11 August 2022, he was killed in a suicide bomb attack in Kabul. The attacker reportedly had a bomb stuck to his amputated leg. Another Taliban-aligned cleric, Mujib Rahman Ansari, was also assassinated a few weeks later.

References 

20th-century births
2022 deaths
Afghan religious leaders
Taliban members
People from Kabul
Terrorism deaths in Afghanistan
People killed by the Islamic State of Iraq and the Levant